Thierry Dominique Lamberton (born 18 October 1966) is a former ice speed skater from France, who represented his native country at the 1992 Winter Olympics in Albertville, France.

References

External links
 SkateResults

1966 births
Living people
French male speed skaters
Speed skaters at the 1992 Winter Olympics
Olympic speed skaters of France
Place of birth missing (living people)